Douglas Heyes (May 22, 1919 – February 8, 1993) was an American film and television writer, director, producer, actor, composer, and author with a long list of accomplishments. He was sometimes credited under the pseudonym Matthew Howard.

Personal life and death
He was the father of actor Douglas Heyes Jr.

He died in Beverly Hills, California on February 8, 1993.

Bibliography
 
 
 , Shamus Award Nominee for Best Original PI Paperback (1986)

Filmography (selected)

As actor
 Aspen – 1977 TV miniseries (uncredited)
also known as The Innocent and the Damned – USA rerun title
 The Twilight Zone – 1959 series
The Invaders – Invader voice (only speaking character in whole episode)

As composer
 Colt .45 – 1957 TV series theme music

As director
 The Highwayman – 1987 TV movie
also known as Terror on the Blacktop
 Magnum, P.I. – 1980 TV series
 The French Atlantic Affair – 1979 TV series
 Captains and the Kings – 1976 TV miniseries
 City of Angels – 1976 TV series
 Baretta – 1975 TV series
 "Powderkeg"- (1971 TV film and pilot for the series Bearcats!)
 Night Gallery – 1970 TV series
 McCloud – 1970 TV series
 Beau Geste – 1966 film
 Kitten with a Whip - 1964 film
 Kraft Suspense Theatre – 1963 TV series (episode "The Trains of Silence")
 The Virginian – 1962 TV series
 Thriller (TV series) - 1960-1962
 The Twilight Zone – 1959 TV series (9 episodes)
 77 Sunset Strip – 1958 TV series
 Naked City – 1958 TV series
 Maverick – 1957 TV series
 The Adventures of Rin Tin Tin – 1954 TV series

As producer
 Barbary Coast – 1975 TV series
 Barbary Coast – 1975 TV film
 Honky Tonk – 1974 TV film (executive producer)
 Bearcats! – 1971 TV series (executive producer)
 Powderkeg – 1971 TV film and pilot for the series Bearcats!
 The Bravo Duke – 1965 TV film

As writer
 North and South (novel) – 1985 TV miniseries
 The French Atlantic Affair – 1979 TV series
 Captains and the Kings – 1976 TV miniseries
 City of Angels – 1976 TV series
 Get Christie Love! – 1975 TV series - episode "I'm Your New Neighbor" (as Matthew Howard)
 "Powderkeg" – 1971 TV film and pilot for the series Bearcats!
 The Groundstar Conspiracy – 1972 film (as Matthew Howard)
 Alias Smith and Jones – 1971 TV series (as Matthew Howard)
 Night Gallery episodes – 1970
 "Brenda"
 "The Dead Man"
 "The Housekeeper"
 McCloud – 1970 TV series
 Ice Station Zebra – 1968 film
 Beau Geste – 1966 film
 "The 12th of Never" – 1963 novel
 The Virginian – 1962 TV series
  Thriller TV series – 1961 – episode "The Hungry Glass"  
77 Sunset Strip – 1958 TV series
 Maverick – 1957 TV series
 The Adventures of Rin Tin Tin – 1954 TV series
 "The Kiss-Off" – 1951 mystery novel

References

External links

1919 births
1993 deaths
American film producers
20th-century American businesspeople